Wuacanthus is a genus of flowering plants belonging to the family Acanthaceae.

Its native range is China.

Species:
 Wuacanthus microdontus (W.W.Sm.) Y.F.Deng, N.H.Xia & H.Peng

References

Acanthaceae
Acanthaceae genera